The Social Democratic Unionists ( - al-Wahdawiuyun al-Dimukatiyyun Al-Ijtima'iyyun) is a political party in Syria. It was part of the National Progressive Front of legally licensed parties which support the socialist and Arab nationalist orientation of the government and accept the leadership of the Ba'ath Party. In the 2007 Syrian parliamentary election the party was awarded none out of 250 seats in the People's Council of Syria.

Arab nationalism in Syria
Arab socialist political parties
Political parties in Syria
Political parties with year of establishment missing
Social democratic parties in Asia
Socialist parties in Syria